The canton of Vitrolles is an administrative division of the Bouches-du-Rhône department, in southeastern France. At the French canton reorganisation which came into effect in March 2015, it was expanded from 1 to 4 communes. Its seat is in Vitrolles.

It consists of the following communes: 
Bouc-Bel-Air 
Cabriès
Saint-Victoret
Vitrolles

References

Cantons of Bouches-du-Rhône